The ISO 217:2013 standard defines the RA and SRA paper formats.

Overview
These paper series are untrimmed raw paper. RA stands for “raw format A” and SRA stands for “supplementary raw format A”. The RA and SRA formats are slightly larger than the corresponding A series formats. This allows bleed (ink to the edge) on printed material that will be later cut down to size. These paper sheets will after printing and binding be cut to match the A format.
 
 The ISO A0 format has an area of 1.00 m²
 The ISO RA0 format has an area of 1.05 m²
 The ISO SRA0 format has an area of 1.15 m²

Tolerances 
Paper in the RA and SRA series format is intended to have a  aspect ratio but the dimensions of the start format have been rounded to whole centimetres.

For example, the RA0 format has been rounded to 860 mm × 1220 mm from the theoretical dimensions .

The resulting real ratios are:

  for RA0, RA2, RA4;
  for RA1, RA3;
  for SRA0, SRA2, SRA4;
  for SRA1, SRA3.

The sizes of the RA series are also slightly larger than corresponding inch-based US sizes specified in ANSI/ASME Y14.1, e.g. RA4 is roughly equivalent to 8½ in × 12 in and ANSI A (alias US Letter) is defined as 8½ in × 11 in.

Other ISO paper standards 
 ISO 216:1975, defines two series of paper sizes: A and B
 ISO 269:1985, defines a C series for envelopes

External links 
 International standard paper sizes: ISO 216 details and rationale
 ISO 216 at iso.org
 ISO 217 at iso.org
 ISO 269 at iso.org

00217
Stationery
Metrication